Rhynencina xanthogaster is a species of tephritid or fruit flies in the genus Rhynencina of the family Tephritidae.

Distribution
Venezuela.

References

Tephritinae
Insects described in 1979
Diptera of South America